Medio millón por una mujer (Half a Million for a Woman) is a 1940 Argentine film.

Production

The 91-minute black and white film was directed for Lumiton by Francisco Múgica.
The script was written by Arturo Cerretani.
The comedy was based on a play by Louis Verneuil, and retained its theatrical structure despite being filmed with a moving camera.
The film starred Eva Franco, Elías Isaac Alippi and Enrique Serrano.

Synopsis

The film is a sophisticated comedy where Elías Alippi plays a playboy who plans the kidnapping of Eva Franco, unhappy wife of millionaire miser.
He poses as a doctor. The consequences are unexpected.

Reception

In the 1940s established film producers were looking to capture foreign markets, while others felt that films should be authentic to local traditions. The critic Raimundo Calcagno ("Calki") saw no conflict. In his view Medio millón por una mujer was an example of a film with a local theme that could be shown in foreign markets and that would give prestige to the Argentine film industry. It could compete with any frivolous comedy made in Hollywood.

Cast
The cast included:

 Eva Franco
 Elías Alippi
 Enrique Serrano
 Teresa Serrador
 Juan Mangiante
 José Ruzzo
 Cirilo Etulain
 Alfredo Fornaresio
 Carlos Rodríguez

References
Citations

Sources

External links

1940 films
1940s Spanish-language films
Argentine black-and-white films
Films based on works by Louis Verneuil
Films directed by Francisco Múgica
Remakes of British films